The 1934 UCI Track Cycling World Championships were the World Championship for track cycling. They took place in Leipzig, Germany from 10 to 19 August 1934. Three events for men were contested, two for professionals and one for amateurs.

Medal summary

Medal table

See also
 1934 UCI Road World Championships

References

1934 in German sport
UCI Track Cycling World Championships by year
International cycle races hosted by Germany
Sports competitions in Leipzig
1934 in track cycling